Freak Brain is a 2005 album released by Danny & The Nightmares. It is their second full-length album.

Track listing
All songs written by Danny & the Nightmares.

 "Haunted House" – 3:01
 "The Lord Loves You" – 3:34
 "Twilight Zone Love" – 3:34
 "Freak Brain" – 2:33
 "Jesus Boy" – 3:13
 "See Satan Die" – 1:20
 "Lucifer Tonite" – 1:45
 "Happy Valentines Day" – 3:22
 "Souvenir" – 3:02
 "Soldier" – 3:03
 "Pretend You're Dead" – 6:34
 "Hell Chick Of Rock N Roll" – 6:34

References 

Daniel Johnston albums
2005 albums